Max Cleworth (born 9 August 2002) is a professional footballer who plays as a defender for Wrexham.

Career

Club career

Cleworth started his career with Wrexham. He signed his first professional contract at Wrexham in 2020. In 2021, he signed for Welsh team Caernarfon Town on a six-month loan.

References

2002 births
Living people
English footballers
Association football defenders
National League (English football) players
Wrexham A.F.C. players
Caernarfon Town F.C. players